Dr. James Ferguson Office is a historic medical office building located at Glens Falls, Warren County, New York.  It was built about 1870 and is a small, square -story Second Empire–style building. It was added to the National Register of Historic Places in 1984. It features a slate mansard roof with a single center dormer.

The building was slated for demolition in 2017 by the city of Glens Falls. A grass-roots restoration campaign resulted in the building's preservation. It was awarded the Excellence in Historic Preservation Award in 2020 by the Preservation League of New York State.

See also
 National Register of Historic Places listings in Warren County, New York

References

Hospital buildings on the National Register of Historic Places in New York (state)
Second Empire architecture in New York (state)
Commercial buildings completed in 1870
Buildings and structures in Warren County, New York
National Register of Historic Places in Warren County, New York